The Stanton Session is a 2001 mix album by the Bristol-based breakbeat duo Stanton Warriors. It contains three tracks by them which all charted on the UK Singles Chart: "Da Virus", "Da Antidote" and "Can You Feel It/Everybody Come On". The latter is a mashup by the duo which was a No. 13 UK hit.

Track listing
 "Intro" - Stanton Warriors - 0:55
 "Jump n' Shout" (Stanton Warriors Remix) - Basement Jaxx - 4:53
 "Distraction"/"Has It Come to This" - Jammin, The Streets/DJ Zinc - 4:39
 "Can You Feel It/Everybody Come On" - Mr. Reds, DJ Skribble - 3:20
 "Action" - Stanton Warriors -	2:30
 "Move It with Your Mind" - Plump DJs - 2:08
 "Bass Tone" -	Sole Fusion - 2:51
 "Good Old Love" - Biological - 3:20
 "The Phantom" - Versions Excursions - 5:57
 "Da Virus" - Stanton Warriors - 4:37
 "Be Bop" - Jeremy Sylvester - 2:58
 "Gyromancer" (False Prophet Mix) - PMT- 5:50
 "Me and Spoonice" (Blue Effect Mix) - Spoon Wizard - 4:15
 "Right Here" - Stanton Warriors - 4:18
 "Da Antidote" - Stanton Warriors - 4:00
 "Runnin" - T Power - 4:16
 "Stone Cold" - Groove Chronicles - 4:26

References

2001 remix albums
Stanton Warriors albums